Evagetes crassicornis is a kleptoparasitic spider wasp with a holarctic distribution.

Description
A red and black spider hunting wasp with fairly short and thick antennae with well-developed sensory powers which it uses to identify the nests of other spider wasps and tarsal combs on the forelegs for digging into these nests.

Biology
In Great Britain and Ireland the flight period is May to September.  E. crassicornis is a kleptoparasitic species probably preying on various species of spider wasp, although specific hosts have not been identified.  It is thought that in Britain the hosts are Arachnospila anceps and Anoplius nigerrimus, and there is a European record of Arachnospila trivialis being parasitised.  E. crassicornis spends a lot of time searching for the nests of its host species on open sunny ground.  Once the host's nest has been invaded E. crassicornis eats the hosts's egg and lays its own on the paralysed spider and then reseals the host's nest.

Adult E. crassicornis visit a wide variety of open flowers which have short corollae, especially Apiaceae and Asteraceae.

Habitat
Although E. crassicornis shows a preference for  sandy habitats, it may be encountered on areas of open ground within a variety of habitats.

Distribution
Northern and central Europe east to central Asia also in North America.

Taxonomy
E. crassicornis forms a group with the closely related E.sahlbergii and E.orientalis.  It also has two subspecies which are

E.c.crassicornis (Shuckard)
E.c. consimilis (Banks) which is found only in western North America, E.c crassicornis replaces it in the east and north of that continent.

References

Hymenoptera of Europe
Pompilinae
Hymenoptera of North America
Insects described in 1857
Taxa named by William Edward Shuckard